W. Dennie Spry Soccer Stadium (usually called Spry Stadium) is a soccer-specific stadium located on the campus of Wake Forest University in Winston-Salem, North Carolina where it is home to the Wake Forest Demon Deacons men's soccer and women's soccer teams.

Opened in 1996, W. Dennie Spry Soccer Stadium is home to the Wake Forest men's and women's soccer programs. Considered one of the top soccer facilities in the country, the 3,000-seat stadium is considered a jewel in Wake Forest's family of athletic facilities and gives the Demon Deacons a true home field advantage.
 
The Spry Stadium complex features a fully lit natural grass playing field along with two lit natural grass practice fields. The facility also includes a state-of-the-art scoreboard and sound system, locker rooms for both the men's and women's teams, a pressbox with rooftop observation deck and concession stands.
The Deacons regularly play in front of packed crowds, as the campus and local communities support the men's and women's teams. A strong contingent of students can always be found on the hill overlooking the north side of the stadium.

Spry Stadium has hosted several major soccer events. The ACC Tournament has been contested four times at Spry: the women's tournament was held there in 1997, while the men's event was held at the venue for three straight years from 1998 to 2000.

In March 2001, Spry Stadium hosted a Major League Soccer exhibition match between the Miami Fusion and D.C. United and an exhibition match between Wake Forest and the United States U-17 National Team.

Spry Stadium will be one of the hosts for the 2020 NCAA Division I Men's Soccer Tournament and the 2020 NCAA Division I Women's Soccer Tournament.

References

External links
 Information at Wake Forest athletics

Sports venues completed in 1996
Wake Forest Demon Deacons soccer
Soccer venues in North Carolina
Sports venues in Winston-Salem, North Carolina
College soccer venues in the United States
1996 establishments in North Carolina